Dosado is a surname. Notable people with the surname include:
Jesus Dosado (1939–2020), Filipino prelate of the Catholic Church
Rozzano Dosado Briguez (born 1964), Filipino general